Daniel "Danny" Roman (born May 10, 1990) is an American former professional boxer. He is a former unified super bantamweight champion, having held the WBA (Unified), and IBF titles from 2019 to 2020, and previously the WBA (Regular) title from 2017 to 2019. As of June 2022, Roman is ranked as the world's fourth-best active super bantamweight by The Ring and the Transnational Boxing Ratings Board.

Professional career

Early career
Roman made his professional debut against Christian Cruz on October 8, 2010. He won the fight by a first-round technical knockout. Roman amassed a 15-2-1 record during the next five years, with five stoppage victories, before being scheduled to fight Daniel Noriega for the vacant WBA-NABA super bantamweight title on July 24, 2015. He won the fight by unanimous decision. Roman made his first title defense against Erik Ruiz on September 25, 2015. He won the fight by unanimous decision. Roman made his second title defense against Ramiro Robles on February 12, 2016. He won the fight by a fifth-round knockout, which was his first stoppage victory since August 16, 2014. Rooman was booked to make his third title defense against Christian Esquivel on May 20, 2016. He once again won the fight by a fifth-round knockout. Roman made his fourth and final WBA NABA title defense against Enrique Quevedo on August 26, 2016. He won the fight by unanimous decision.

Roman was booked to face Marlon Olea in a non-title bout on November 18, 2016. He won the fight by unanimous decision. His 13-fight winning streak earned Roman the right to fight Adam Lopez in a title eliminator bout for the WBA (Regular) super bantamweight title. His fight with Lopez was scheduled for January 20, 2017, and took place at the Bally's Atlantic City in Atlantic City, New Jersey. Lopez retired from the fight at the end of the ninth round.

WBA super bantamweight champion

Roman vs. Kubo
Roman was booked to challenge the reigning WBA "World" super-bantamweight champion in the latter's first title defense. The bout was booked for September 3, 2017, as the main event of Showtime's "ShoBox: The New Generation", and took place at the Shimadzu Arena in Kyoto, Japan. Although Kubo was seen as a significant step-up in competition for Roman, and despite the fight taking place in Kubo's hometown, Roman entered the fight as a slight 8/11 favorite to win. Roman won the fight by a dominant ninth-round technical knockout. Roman dropped and cut Kubo above the left eye thirty seconds into the seventh round. He followed this up by knocking Kubo down with a straight right near the end of the eight round. Kubo flagged in the ninth round, and failed to respond to Roman's flurry of punches, which prompted referee Pinit Prayadsab to stop the fight.

Roman vs. Matsumoto
On December 19, 2017, it was announced that Roman would make his first world title defense against the #13 ranked WBA super-bantamweight contender Ryo Matsumoto. The bout was scheduled as the main event of a card which took place at the Korakuen Hall in Tokyo, Japan. Roman won the fight by a wide unanimous decision, with two judges awarding him a 119-109 scorecard, while the third judge scored it 118-110 for Roman.

Roman vs. Flores
On March 17, 2018, the WBA ordered Roman to make his second title defense against the undefeated Moises Flores, and gave both parties 30 days to negotiate the terms of the fight. The fight was officially announced for June 16, 2018, as the co-featured bout for an IBF world welterweight title fight between Errol Spence Jr. and Carlos Ocampo. Roman came into the fight as a -800 favorite, while most odds-makers had Flores as a +575 underdog. Flores came in heavy at 123 lbs, two pounds above the super bantamweight limit. Roman won the fight by a lopsided unanimous decision, with scores of 120-108, 118-110 and 116-110.

Roman vs. McDonnell
Roman was booked to make his third title defense against Gavin McDonnell on October 6, 2018. The bout took place at the Wintrust Arena in Chicago, Illinois, and was broadcast by DAZN. Roman was a smaller favorite compared to his previous title fights, with most odds-makers having him a -285 favorite and McDonnell a +245 underdog. Roman won the fight by a tenth-round technical knockout. He staggered McDonnell with a right, before flooring him with a flurry of punches. McDonnell was able to beat the ten count, but was unsteady on his feet, which promoted referee Mark Nelson to wave the fight off. Roman was leading on the scorecards at the time of the stoppage, with scores of 86-85, 89-82 and 86-85.

Unified super bantamweight champion

Roman vs. Doheny
On January 18, 2019, Roman joined IBF super bantamweight champion T. J. Doheny in the ring, following Doheny's victory against Ryohei Takahashi. The two agreed on a title unification bout later in the year, with Roman stating: "From champion to champion, let’s give the best fight and let the best win". The fight was officially announced for April 26, 2019, to take place at The Forum in Inglewood, California, and to be broadcast by DAZN and Sky Sports. Roman entered the fight as a -700 favorite. He justified his role as the favorite, as he won the fight by majority decision. Two of the judges scored the fight 116-110 in his favor, while the third judge scored it as an even 113-113 draw. Roman knocked Doheny down twice, with a left hook in the second round and a body strike in the eleventh round. He out-landed Doheny 195 to 174 in total punches and 150 to 127 in power punches landed.

Roman vs. Akhmadaliev
Roman was booked to make the first defense of his unified WBA and IBF super bantamweight titles against mandatory WBA title challenger Murodjon Akhmadaliev. Akhmadaliev was ranked #1 by the WBA at super bantamweight. The fight was scheduled as the co-featured bout of a DAZN broadcast card, which took place on January 20, 2020, at the Meridian at Island Gardens in Miami, Florida. Roman entered a title fight as an underdog for the first time in his career, as most odds-makers had him as a +195 underdog and Akhmadaliev as a -225 favorite. Akhmadaliev won the fight by split decision. Two of the judges scored the fight 115-113 for Akhmadaliev, while the third judge awarded the same scorecard to Roman. Roman demanded an immediate rematch in a later interview, stating: "I want a rematch because I think I won the fight". Roman earned a reported $500 000, while Akhmadaliev earned a reported $100 000.

Continued super bantamweight career

Roman vs. Payano 
Roman was scheduled to face Juan Carlos Payano on the undercard of The Charlos vs. Derevyanchenko and Rosario on September 26, 2020. Roman returned to his usual role of the favorite, as he entered the fight a -1781 pick to win. Roman won the fight by unanimous decision, with all three judges scoring the fight 116-112 in his favor.

Roman vs. Franco 
Roman was booked to face Ricardo Espinoza Franco on May 15, 2021. Franco was ranked #7 by the WBO and #14 by the IBF at super bantamweight. He justified his role as the betting favorite, as he won the fight by unanimous decision. Two of the judges scored the fight 98-92 for him, while the third judge scored it 97-93 for Roman.

Roman vs. Fulton 
Roman is scheduled to challenge the unified WBO and WBC super bantamweight champion Stephan Fulton at Minneapolis Armory in Minneapolis, Minnesota, on June 5, 2022. He lost the fight by a dominant unanimous decision, with two judges scoring all twelve rounds for his opponent, while the third judge awarded him one round. on August 30, 2022, Roman announced his retirement from boxing.

Professional boxing record

See also
List of world super-bantamweight boxing champions
List of Mexican boxing world champions

References

External links

Daniel Roman - Profile, News Archive & Current Rankings at Box.Live

 

1990 births
Living people
Boxers from Los Angeles
American male boxers
American boxers of Mexican descent
Super-bantamweight boxers
World super-bantamweight boxing champions
World Boxing Association champions
International Boxing Federation champions